Toy Soldiers is an original novel written by Paul Leonard and based on the long-running British science fiction television series Doctor Who. It features the Seventh Doctor, Bernice, Chris and Roz.

Synopsis
The Doctor, Benny, Chris and Roz are in Europe in the aftermath of World War I. Children are going missing and it is tied to an alien world that has been going through its own war.

1995 British novels
1995 science fiction novels
Virgin New Adventures
Novels by Paul Leonard
Seventh Doctor novels
Fiction set in 1919